"A Tout le Monde" is a song by American heavy metal band Megadeth, featured on their 1994 studio album Youthanasia. It was released as a single in February 1995 through Capitol Records. The song was later remade and reissued as "À Tout le Monde (Set Me Free)", featuring Cristina Scabbia of Lacuna Coil, on Megadeth's 2007 studio album United Abominations. The song's chorus, "à tout le monde, à tous mes amis, je vous aime, je dois partir", translated into English is, "to the whole world, to all my friends, I love you, I have to go", which prompted controversy after accusations that it was pro-suicide.

Music and lyrics
The music video for "A Tout le Monde" was banned by MTV, who claimed it was pro-suicide. However, in an interview conducted around 1994, Megadeth frontman Dave Mustaine stated: It's not a suicide song. What it is, it's, you, it's when people have a loved one that dies and they end on a bad note, you know, they wish that they could say something to them. So this is an opportunity for the deceased to say something before they go. And it was my impression of what I would like to say to people, if I had say, 3 seconds to do so in life before I died I'd say to the entire world, to all my friends, I love you all, and now I must go. These are the last words I'll ever speak, and they'll set me free. I don't have to say I'm sorry, I don't have to say I'm going to miss you, or I'll wait for ya. You know, I'll just say I loved you all, good, bad, indifferent, I loved you all.

Title
The song's title, "A tout le monde", is French for "To all the world" or "To everyone". The song's chorus, "à tout le monde, à tous mes amis, je vous aime, je dois partir", translated to English is respectively: "To everyone, to all my friends, I love you, I have to leave".

The original release of the song does not feature a grave accent on the letter "à" anywhere within the title, liner notes, lyrics or cover art. This was later rectified on the 2007 version.

Track listing
US promotional edition

Dutch edition

2007 version

The song was remade in 2007 on the album United Abominations as "À Tout le Monde (Set Me Free)", sung as a duet between Mustaine and Cristina Scabbia, singer of Italian metal band Lacuna Coil. The guitars for the song are all in standard tuning (bringing the song to F-sharp minor), whereas the original was recorded a half-step down in E♭ tuning (which put the song in F minor). The new version is also slightly faster, and the guitar solo performed by Glen Drover is musically 4 bars longer than the original by Marty Friedman. "À Tout le Monde (Set Me Free)" was the first single released from the album, with a new music video made for it. The song's title has been revised in order to distinguish it from the original, although this alteration does not appear on some pressings of the album. The title also features the aforementioned grave accent on the letter "à", which was omitted on the original version.

Reception
On June 11, 2007, the video for the single won its sixteenth victory in the context of the one-on-one video show, L'Ultime Combat des Clips, aired Monday to Thursday on the French-Canadian music channel, Musique Plus. Winning sixteen consecutive times earned them a star in the show's hall of fame. Despite the accolades, both the original music video for "A Tout le Monde" and its remake remain banned by MTV, possibly for lyrical content that they deem to be pertaining to committing suicide. The duet version did, however, air on MTV2's Headbangers Ball upon release.

Personnel
Youthanasia version:
Dave Mustaine – lead vocals, rhythm guitar
Marty Friedman – lead guitar
David Ellefson – bass
Nick Menza – drums, percussion

''United Abominations'' version:
Dave Mustaine – lead vocals, rhythm guitar
Glen Drover – lead guitar
James LoMenzo – bass
Shawn Drover – drums, percussion
Cristina Scabbia – guest vocals

Charts

References 

1990s ballads
2000s ballads
1994 songs
1995 singles
2007 songs
2007 singles
Capitol Records singles
Franglais songs
Heavy metal ballads
Megadeth songs
Music videos directed by Wayne Isham
Songs about death
Songs written by Dave Mustaine
Male–female vocal duets
Macaronic songs

pt:À Tout le Monde (Set Me Free)
ru:À Tout le Monde (Set Me Free)